The Prince is an American animated sitcom created by Gary Janetti for HBO Max. Originally slated for a late spring 2021 date, HBO Max announced on May 9, 2021, that the series would be delayed due to Prince Philip's death in April 2021. The series premiered on July 29, 2021. In February 2022, HBO Max cancelled the series after one season.

Plot
The Prince focuses on an eight-year-old Prince George who makes life hard for his family and the British monarchy.

Cast
Gary Janetti as Prince George of Cambridge
Orlando Bloom as Prince Harry, Duke of Sussex
Condola Rashad as Meghan, Duchess of Sussex
Lucy Punch as Catherine, Duchess of Cambridge
Alan Cumming as Owen
Frances de la Tour as Elizabeth II
Iwan Rheon as Prince William, Duke of Cambridge
Sophie Turner as Princess Charlotte of Cambridge
Dan Stevens as Charles, Prince of Wales and Prince Philip, Duke of Edinburgh

Episodes

Production
, Janetti has released five shorts for the series on his Instagram that are not part of the actual series itself,  which comment on current events and holidays, such as the pandemic, Halloween, Valentines Day, and Easter.<ref>{{cite web|url=https://deadline.com/2020/12/queen-elizabeth-christmas-speech-parody-family-guy-creator-gary-janetti-prince-george-1234661799/|title=Queen Elizabeths Christmas Speech Gets Another Parody From 'Family Guy' Producer – This Time, With Prince George|last=Haring|first=Bruce|date=December 27, 2020|access-date=December 28, 2020|website=Deadline Hollywood}}</ref> On July 28, 2021, HBO Max announced the series would be released the next day, with 12 episodes.

On February 16, 2022, HBO Max cancelled the series after one season.

ReceptionThe Prince received an overwelmingly negative reception by critics, with some critics and producers criticizing the show as being unfair and inappropriate. Before the series came out, Kayleigh Donaldson of Pajiba criticized Janetti, saying that the series "lacks intent and appropriate targets."

Joel Keller of Decider urged readers to skip the series, describing it as "essentially a royal version of Family Guy'', and not nearly as biting and funny".

References

External links

2020s American animated comedy television series
2020s American adult animated television series
2020s American satirical television series
2020s American sitcoms
2021 American television series debuts
2021 American television series endings
American adult animated comedy television series
American flash adult animated television series
American animated sitcoms
English-language television shows
HBO Max original programming
Television series by Fox Television Animation
Television series by 20th Century Fox Television
Television series about royalty
Cultural depictions of Elizabeth II
Cultural depictions of Charles III
Cultural depictions of William, Prince of Wales
Cultural depictions of Catherine, Princess of Wales
Cultural depictions of Prince Harry, Duke of Sussex
Cultural depictions of Meghan, Duchess of Sussex
Animated television series about children
Animated television series about dysfunctional families